Gradešnica is a village in the Municipality of Novaci of North Macedonia, located in the northwestern foothills of the Voras Mountains. It used to be part of the former municipality of Staravina.

History
Gradešnica and the surrounding area was caught in the middle of major military action during World War I. The Macedonian front passed through the area and the decisive Battle of Dobro Pole took place nearby.

Demographics
Gradešnica is attested in the Ottoman defter of 1467/68 as a village in the vilayet of Manastir. The majority of the inhabitants  attested bore typical Albanian anthroponyms, such as Gjin, Gjon, Lazor, Dedë etc.

According to Ethnographie des Vilayets D'Andrinople, de Monastir, et de Salonique, published in Constantinople in 1878, the village had a total of 94 households with 415 male inhabitants.

According to the 2002 census, the village had a total of 89 inhabitants. Ethnic groups in the village include:

Macedonians 88
Turks 1

People from Gradešnica 

 Traianos Nallis, Greek notable and politician
 Traian Stoianovich,  American historian who specialized in the history of the Balkans

References

External links
 Gradesnica (Градешница) village in Mariovo

Villages in Novaci Municipality